Admiralty scaffolding, also known as Obstacle Z.1 or sometimes simply given as beach scaffolding or anti-tank scaffolding, was a British design of anti-tank and anti-boat obstacle made of tubular steel. It was widely deployed on beaches of southern England, eastern England and South West England during the invasion crisis of 1940-1941. Scaffolding was also used, though more sparingly, inland.

Design and use
Of a number of similar designs, by far the most common was designated obstacle Z.1. Each upright was braced by a pair of diagonal tubes, at about 45°, to the rear.  wide sections were assembled then carried to the sea to be placed in position at the half tide mark as an obstacle to boats.

Tests in October 1940, confirmed that tanks could only break through with difficulty, as a result Z.1 was adopted as an anti-tank barrier for beaches thought suitable for landing tanks. As an anti-tank barrier it was placed at or just above the high water point where it would be difficult for tanks to get enough momentum to break through the barrier. In some places, two sets of scaffolding were set up, one in the water against boats and one at high water against tanks.

The problem of securing the barriers on sand was overcome by the development of the "sword picket" by Stewarts & Lloyds – this device was later known at the Admiralty as the "Wallace Sword".

Barriers varying in length from a couple of hundred feet to three miles were constructed consuming 50% of Britain's production of scaffolding steel at an estimated cost of £6,600 per mile (equivalent to £ today).

After the war, the scaffolding got in the way of swimmers, subsequently it was removed for scrap and remaining traces are very rare, but occasionally revealed by storms.

See also 
British anti-invasion preparations of World War II
British hardened field defences of World War II

References

Notes

General references

Collections

Further reading 

Anti-tank obstacles
Area denial weapons
United Kingdom home front during World War II